The Leap is a coastal rural locality in the Mackay Region, Queensland, Australia. In the  The Leap had a population of 642 people.

Geography
The locality is bounded to the north-west by Constant Creek and to the north by its mouth into the Coral Sea. Sand Bay is offshore. 

The Bruce Highway enters the locality from the south-east (Farleigh) and exits to the south-west (Hampden). The North Coast railway line follows a similar route to the north of the highway but there are no railway stations on that line serving the locality. There is a network of cane tramways in the locality to transport the harvested sugarcane to the sugar mill for processing.

The locality has a number of named peaks, including:

 Sugarloaf Peak 
 The Leap (Mount Mandurana) 
 The Sister

History
The area takes its location name from an historical event on top of a local mountain, Mount Mandarana in 1865. Following an incident at the Cremorne Gardens homestead just north of the Pioneer River Mackay settlement, where John Barnes had been speared and a few days later attacked James Weir at the same property. Under direction of Sub-Inspector Robert Arthur Johnstone, Native Police were dispatched from Fort Cooper to track the hunting party to Mount Mandarana. Here an Aboriginal woman with a baby wrapped in the stolen shawl jumped to her death to evade capture. Following incident, the location became known as "The Gin Leap".  

The Aboriginal woman's child survived by the shawl for which she was wrapped in caught in the cliff face shrubbery. Pioneering settlers James Ready and Mr Allen, who had accompanied the Native Police, climbed down to save the child. James Ready later adopted the baby and was baptised Johanna 'Judy' Hazeldene (surnamed chosen after another local location) on 22 July 1867. Judy married an English man named George Howes in 1887, by whom she had a boy Bill and two daughters Esme and May. Johanna Hazeldene died on 25 December 1897 and is buried in Mackay Cemetery.  

An estimate of approximately 200 Aboriginal men, women and children are believed to have resided in the Mandarana area at the beginning of the white settlement advancing on the area with pastoral leases north of the Pioneer River.

The North Coast railway line reached The Leap in 1924 with the area being served by the following now-abandoned stations (from south to north):

 Wundaru railway station
 Mapalo railway station

 The Leap railway station
Yakapari railway station

In the 2011 census, The Leap had a population of 673 people.

In the  The Leap had a population of 642 people.

The Leap Provisional School opened on 13 March 1893. On 1 January 1909 it became The Leap State School. In 1919 Arthur Edward Hunter (of The Leap Hotel) donated  of land for the school. The school closed on 8 August 1969. As the land had been donated for school purposes, the usual practice was that the land was returned to the donor or their heirs. Two people made claims to be Hunter's relatives, the Queensland Government did not find the claims to be proven and decided in 1988 to sell the land and kept the proceeds. The school was at 2105 Maraju Yakapari Road.

Heritage listings

The Leap has a number of heritage-listed sites, including:
 Bruce Highway: The Leap Cane Lift

Attractions
A sculpture representing Koweha, holding a shawl, was erected outside a local hotel in the area, circa 1980s.

References

Further reading 

 
 

 
Mackay Region
Coastline of Queensland
Localities in Queensland